City Hall in Perth Amboy, Middlesex County, New Jersey, United States, is a historic building built in the early 18th century, listed on New Jersey Register of Historic Places and the National Register of Historic Places. It is now the oldest public building in continuous use in the United States.

History
Construction of the building began in 1714 and was completed in 1717. It served as the local courthouse and jail, and was also used by the Provincial Assembly until 1775. The building has twice been rebuilt after being badly damaged by fire; first in 1731, rebuilt until 1745, and again around 1765 following an arson attack believed to have been committed by a former inmate who was imprisoned on debt charges. It was rebuilt a second time in 1767.

City Hall has undergone three renovations, most recently in 2006, although some of the original structure remains. The building is now Victorian in style.

A two-room surveyor's office was built adjacent to City Hall in 1867, which was used by the General Board of Proprietors of the Eastern Division of New Jersey.

Notable events
On November 20, 1789, the State of New Jersey became the first to ratify the United States Bill of Rights.

On March 31, 1870 Thomas Mundy Peterson (1824–1904) became the first African American to vote in an election under the just-enacted provisions of the 15th Amendment to the United States Constitution.

See also
 List of the oldest buildings in the United States
 List of the oldest courthouses in the United States
 List of the oldest buildings in New Jersey
 National Register of Historic Places listings in Middlesex County, New Jersey

References

External links 
Landmark Hunter: Perth Amboy City Hall and Surveyor General's Office
YourMapper: Perth Amboy City Hall and Surveyor General's Office
Flickr: Perth Amboy

African-American history of New Jersey
Perth Amboy, New Jersey
City and town halls on the National Register of Historic Places in New Jersey
Colonial government in America
Pre-statehood history of New Jersey
Tourist attractions in Middlesex County, New Jersey
City and town halls in New Jersey
Government buildings completed in 1718
National Register of Historic Places in Middlesex County, New Jersey
New Jersey Register of Historic Places
1718 establishments in New Jersey